Alfred Merz (24 January 1880 – 16 August 1925) was an Austrian geographer, oceanographer and director of the Institute of Marine Science in Berlin.  He died of pneumonia in Buenos Aires while on an expedition to survey the South Atlantic and is buried in Perchtoldsdorf.  Merz Peninsula is named after him.

Literary works 
 Hydrographische Untersuchungen im Golf von Triest, 1911
 Die Oberflächentemperatur der Gewässer, 1920
 Die atlantische Vertikalzirkulation, 1922-1933 (with Georg Wüst)

Other readings 
 Writings about exploration with the German research vessel Meteor, completed by Albert Josef Maria Defant

References

External links
 Overview of Lectures by Alfred Merz from the University of Leipzig (1906).
 

1880 births
1925 deaths
19th-century Austrian scientists
20th-century Austrian scientists
19th-century explorers
20th-century explorers
Austrian explorers
Austrian geographers
Austrian oceanographers
Austrian expatriates in Germany
Austrian expatriates in Brazil
People from Mödling District
Deaths from pneumonia in Argentina
20th-century geographers